The women's coxless pair rowing event at the 2015 Pan American Games was held from 11–13 July at the Royal Canadian Henley Rowing Course in St. Catharines.

Schedule
All times are Eastern Standard Time (UTC-3).

Results

Heat

Final

References

Women's rowing at the 2015 Pan American Games